The commune of Vugizo is a commune of Makamba Province in southern Burundi. The capital lies at Vugizo.

References

Communes of Burundi
Makamba Province